Amiana is a monotypic moth genus of the family Noctuidae. Its only species, Amiana niama, is found in the US state of Arizona. Both the genus and species were first described by Harrison Gray Dyar Jr. in 1904.

References

Acronictinae
Noctuoidea genera
Monotypic moth genera